Miraxis is a genus of moths of the family Crambidae. It contains only one species, Miraxis klotsi, which is found in Peru.

References

Natural History Museum Lepidoptera genus database

Crambini
Moths of South America
Monotypic moth genera
Crambidae genera
Taxa named by Stanisław Błeszyński